The Richard L. Kitchens Post No. 41 is a historic American Legion hall at 409 Porter Street in Helena, Arkansas.  Built in 1922 to a design by a local Legionnaire, this Rustic log structure is supposedly the first American Legion hall to be referred to as a "hut", and is the oldest Legion building in the city.  Its main block is built of donated materials, including the cypress logs forming its walls, and built by volunteer labor supervised by a local contractor and Legionnaire.  A frame addition was added to the rear of the building in 1949 (for which the gable roof was extended), as were two shed-roof additions.

The building was listed on the National Register of Historic Places in 1976.

See also
National Register of Historic Places listings in Phillips County, Arkansas

References

Clubhouses on the National Register of Historic Places in Arkansas
Buildings and structures completed in 1922
Buildings and structures in Phillips County, Arkansas
American Legion buildings
National Register of Historic Places in Phillips County, Arkansas